Rostovsky (masculine), Rostovskaya (feminine), or Rostovskoye (neuter) may refer to:
Aleksey Lobanov-Rostovsky (1824–1896), Russian statesman
Rostovsky District, a district of Yaroslavl Oblast, Russia
Rostovsky (inhabited locality) (Rostovskaya, Rostovskoye), several rural localities in Russia
Rostov Oblast (Rostovskaya oblast), a federal subject of Russia

See also
Rostov (disambiguation)